Sangrambhaiya Arunkaka Jagtap is a member of the 13th Maharashtra Legislative Assembly. He represents the Ahmednagar City Assembly Constituency. He belongs to the Nationalist Congress Party.

On 22 March 2017, Jagtap was suspended along with 18 other MLAs until 31 December for interrupting Maharashtra Finance Minister Sudhir Mungantiwar during a state budget session and burning copies of the budget outside the assembly four days earlier.

On 7 April 2018 MLA Sangram Jagtap was among four held for murder of two Shiv Sena men in Maharashtra's Ahmednagar. Meanwhile, supporters of Jagtap allegedly vandalised the office of Ahmednagar superintendent of police after he was held in connection with the killings.

References

Maharashtra MLAs 2014–2019
People from Ahmednagar
Marathi politicians
Nationalist Congress Party politicians from Maharashtra
Year of birth missing (living people)
Living people